Thomas Hanning Miller was a professional Scottish footballer who played as an outside left in the Football League for Burnley.

References 

Year of birth missing
Year of death missing
Scottish footballers
English Football League players
Burnley F.C. players
Footballers from Hamilton, South Lanarkshire
Association football outside forwards
Newcastle United F.C. players
Scottish Junior Football Association players
Accrington Stanley F.C. (1891) players
Heart of Midlothian F.C. players
Blantyre Celtic F.C. players